Three Out Change is the debut studio album by Supercar. Released on April 1, 1998, it peaked at number 20 on the Oricon Albums Chart. The album helped establish Supercar as an important and influential Japanese rock band. Music critic Ian Martin has described it as an "epic indie rock/shoegaze album" and "one of the all-time great Japanese rock albums."

Track listing

Personnel
Credits adapted from the liner notes.
 Koji Nakamura – vocals, guitar
 Junji Ishiwatari – guitar
 Miki Furukawa – vocals, bass guitar
 Kodai Tazawa – drums

Charts

References

External links
 

1998 debut albums
Supercar (band) albums
Epic Records albums